Nikolai Aleksandrovich Boyarkin (born 20 December 2001) is a Russian football player. He plays for FC Salyut Belgorod.

Club career
He made his debut in the Russian Football National League for FC Mordovia Saransk on 7 September 2019 in a game against FC Luch Vladivostok, substituting Yevgeni Strelov in the 82nd minute.

References

External links
 Profile by Russian Football National League
 

2001 births
People from Saransk
Sportspeople from Mordovia
Living people
Russian footballers
Association football midfielders
FC Mordovia Saransk players
FC Salyut Belgorod players
Russian First League players
Russian Second League players